Carex bella is a tussock-forming species of perennial sedge in the family Cyperaceae. It is native to parts of the United States and Mexico.

See also
List of Carex species

References

bella
Taxa named by Liberty Hyde Bailey
Plants described in 1892
Flora of Mexico
Flora of California
Flora of Arizona
Flora of New Mexico
Flora of Colorado
Flora of South Dakota
Flora of Wyoming
Flora of Utah